Gaylussacia is a genus of about fifty species of flowering plants in the family Ericaceae, native to the Americas, where they occur in eastern North America and in South America in the Andes and the mountains of southeastern Brazil (the majority of the known species). Common English names include huckleberry (shared with plants in several other genera) and "dangleberry".

Gaylussacia plants are often a component of an oak-heath forest.

Ecology
Gaylussacia species are used as food plants by the larvae of some Lepidoptera (butterflies and moths) species including Coleophora gaylussaciella (which feeds exclusively on Gaylussacia) and Coleophora multicristatella.

Classification 
Gaylussacia is named in honor of the French chemist Joseph Louis Gay-Lussac (1778–1850). It is closely related to Vaccinium, and it is still unclear whether the commonly understood line between Vaccinium and Gaylussacia is justified.  A 2002 paper found that molecular data did not support past divisions of Gaylussacia into sections.

Species

References

External links 
New York Botanic Gardens: Gaylussacia

 
Ericaceae genera
Flora of North America
Flora of South America
Taxa named by Carl Sigismund Kunth